Murray County is a county in the U.S. state of Minnesota. The population was 8,179 at the 2020 census. Its county seat is Slayton.

History
In 1853 the Minnesota Territory legislature created Blue Earth County from unorganized Dakota Territory lands. In 1855 the legislature partitioned a portion of western Blue Earth to create Brown County. Then on May 23, 1857, a portion of Brown was partitioned off to create Murray County, although it was not organized at that time. On June 17, 1872, the county government was effected, with Currie, which had been founded that same year, as county seat. The county was named for William Pitt Murray (1825-1910), a prominent civic and political figure in Minnesota during its nascent era.

Also in 1872 the township of Center was platted (so named for its central position in the county). This settlement grew rapidly, and its residents soon began agitating to have the county seat moved there. In 1882 the town was renamed as Slayton, and a county vote changed the county seat to Slayton effective June 1, 1889.

In the history of record keeping, Minnesota has been struck by two F-5 tornadoes, and both occurred in Murray County: the Chandler-Lake Wilson Tornado (June 16, 1992) and the Tracy Tornado (June 13, 1968) that began in Murray County before crossing north into Lyon County.

Geography
The county terrain consists of low rolling hills, dotted with lakes and ponds, with all available area devoted to agriculture. The terrain slopes to the south and east. However, its highest elevation occurs on Buffalo Ridge, a promontory extending about two miles along the crest of the Coteau des Prairies in central Chanarambie Township. The bluff rises a few hundred feet above the adjacent valleys.

The Mississippi-Missouri watershed divide runs through the western part of the county, near Chandler, along Buffalo Ridge. The county's highest point is on that ridge, at 1,920' ASL.

Major highways

  U.S. Highway 59
  Minnesota State Highway 30
  Minnesota State Highway 62
  Minnesota State Highway 91
  Minnesota State Highway 267

Airports
 Slayton Municipal Airport (DVP) - southwest of Slayton, Minnesota

Adjacent counties

 Lyon County - north
 Redwood County - northeast
 Cottonwood County - east
 Nobles County - south
 Rock County - southwest
 Pipestone County - west

Protected areas

 Badger Lake State Wildlife Management Area
 Bergman State Wildlife Management Area
 Big Slough State Wildlife Management Area
 Buffalo Lake State Wildlife Management Area
 Chandler State Wildlife Management Area
 County Line State Wildlife Management Area
 Current Lake State Wildlife Management Area
 Great Oasis State Wildlife Management Area
 Haberman State Wildlife Management Area
 Hjermstad Lake State Wildlife Management Area
 Irruption State Wildlife Management Area
 Klinker State Wildlife Management Area
 Lake Shetek State Park
 Lange State Wildlife Management Area
 Leeds State Wildlife Management Area
 Lowville State Wildlife Management Area
 Mason State Wildlife Management Area
 McCord-Laible State Wildlife Management Area
 Nelson State Wildlife Management Area
 Northern Tallgrass Prairie National Wildlife Refuge
 Peters State Wildlife Management Area
 Phelan State Wildlife Management Area
 Reinhold State Wildlife Management Area
 Rupp State Wildlife Management Area
 Ruthton State Wildlife Management Area
 Schoeberl State Wildlife Management Area
 Shetek State Wildlife Management Area
 Sweetman State Wildlife Management Area
 Tutt State Wildlife Management Area
 Van Eck State Wildlife Management Area

Lakes

 Bear Lake (drained)
 Bloody Lake
 Buffalo Lake
 Corabelle Lake
 Current Lake
 Fox Lake
 Fulda First Lake
 Iron Lake
 Julia Lake (part)
 Lake Louisa
 Lake Maria
 Lake Sarah
 Lake Shetek
 Lake Wilson
 Lime Lake (formerly known as Lizzard Lake and Lake St. Rose)
 Long Lake (part)
 North Badger Lake
 Round Lake
 Smith Lake
 South Badger Lake
 Summit Lake
 Talcot Lake (part)

Demographics

2000 census
As of the 2000 census, there were 9,165 people, 3,722 households, and 2,601 families in the county.  The population density was 13/sqmi (5.02/km2). There were 4,357 housing units at an average density of 6.18/sqmi (2.39/km2). The racial makeup of the county was 98.34% White, 0.10% Black or African American, 0.22% Native American, 0.21% Asian, 0.02% Pacific Islander, 0.45% from other races, and 0.67% from two or more races.  1.47% of the population were Hispanic or Latino of any race. 47.3% were of German, 12.9% Norwegian, 12.5% Dutch and 5.1% Swedish ancestry.

There were 3,722 households, out of which 29.00% had children under the age of 18 living with them, 62.50% were married couples living together, 4.60% had a female householder with no husband present, and 30.10% were non-families. 27.10% of all households were made up of individuals, and 15.30% had someone living alone who was 65 years of age or older. The average household size was 2.42 and the average family size was 2.94.

The county population contained 25.00% under the age of 18, 5.90% from 18 to 24, 23.30% from 25 to 44, 24.70% from 45 to 64, and 21.20% who were 65 years of age or older. The median age was 42 years. For every 100 females there were 98.50 males. For every 100 females age 18 and over, there were 97.00 males.

The median income for a household in the county was $34,966, and the median income for a family was $40,893. Males had a median income of $27,101 versus $19,636 for females. The per capita income for the county was $17,936.  About 6.30% of families and 8.30% of the population were below the poverty line, including 8.40% of those under age 18 and 9.40% of those age 65 or over.

2020 Census

Communities

Cities

 Avoca
 Chandler
 Currie
 Dovray
 Fulda
 Hadley
 Iona
 Lake Wilson
 Slayton (county seat)

Census-designated place
 The Lakes

Unincorporated communities

 Current Lake
 Lime Creek
 Lowville
 Owanka
 Wirock

Townships

 Belfast Township
 Bondin Township
 Cameron Township
 Chanarambie Township
 Des Moines River Township
 Dovray Township
 Ellsborough Township
 Fenton Township
 Holly Township
 Iona Township
 Lake Sarah Township
 Leeds Township
 Lime Lake Township
 Lowville Township
 Mason Township
 Moulton Township
 Murray Township
 Shetek Township
 Skandia Township
 Slayton Township

Government and politics
The county matched the national outcome every year from 1964 until 2008 except 1988, when during the farm crisis it voted for Michael Dukakis. However, like most other rural heavily white areas of the country. In 60% of presidential elections since 1980, the county selected the Republican Party candidate (as of 2020).

See also
 National Register of Historic Places listings in Murray County, Minnesota

References

External links
 Murray County government's website

 
Minnesota counties
1872 establishments in Minnesota
Populated places established in 1872